Bleasdalea bleasdalei is a species of rainforest tree in the family Proteaceae from far north Queensland. First described as Grevillea bleasdalei by Ferdinand von Mueller, it was placed in its current genus in 1975.

References

bleasdalei
Flora of Queensland
Endemic flora of Australia
Trees of Australia
Endangered flora of Australia
Plants described in 1865
Taxa named by Ferdinand von Mueller